WVGV is a Religious formatted broadcast radio station licensed to West Union, West Virginia, serving Doddridge County, West Virginia.  WVGV is owned and operated by Araiza Revival Ministries, Inc.

Translator
WVGV is also heard in the Clarksburg, West Virginia area at 96.7 FM, through translator W244CB, licensed to West Milford, West Virginia.

External links
 89.7FM The Voice Online
 

VGV